Redeye was an American rock band from Los Angeles, California, United States. The group released two albums on Pentagram Records in the early 1970s, and had two hit singles in 1971, "Games" (U.S. Billboard Hot 100 chart number 27) and "Redeye Blues" (U.S. number 78).

Members
Douglas "Red" Mark - vocals, guitar (previously of The Sunshine Company)
Dave Hodgkins - guitar, vocals
Bill Kirkham - bass guitar, vocals
Bob Bereman - drums and percussion

Post 1985:
Brett Martin - bass/vocals
Steve Strain - saxophone/keys/vocals
Ron McCann - lead guitar/vocals

Album discography
Redeye (Pentagram, 1970) U.S. Billboard Hot 200 peak number 113
One Man's Poison (Pentagram, 1972)
Back To The Wall (Wrinkle, 1987)

See also
List of 1970s one-hit wonders in the United States

References

Musical groups from Los Angeles
Rock music groups from California